Thunder Over Texas is a 1934 American populist contemporary Western film directed by Edgar G. Ulmer under the alias Joen Warner (the name of Ulmer's previous wife) and produced by two nephews of Universal Pictures head Carl Laemmle, Arthur and Max Alexander's Poverty Row Beacon Productions.  The film's story was written by Shirley Ulmer under the name of Sherle Castle.  Shirley was then married to Max Alexander but would soon leave Max to marry Edgar with the result that Lammele blacklisted Ulmer from Hollywood. The film was shot in Kernville, California.

Thunder Over Texas was the first of several Westerns produced by the Alexanders starring Guinn "Big Boy" Williams.

Plot
The film opens with an apparent bank robbery terminated when the driver of the alleged getaway car is fatally shot by a sniper.  Inside the car is the late driver's daughter, Tiny Norton who is adopted by rancher Ted Wright and his Three Stooges type ranch hands, Tom, Dick and Harry,  the "Three Radio Nuts" who spend their time impersonating radio stars. The robbery and assassination of Tiny's father was orchestrated by a cruel and corrupt banker in cahoots with a crooked sheriff.

Cast
Guinn "Big Boy" Williams	... Ted Wright 
Marion Shilling 	... 	Helen Mason
Helen Westcott 	... Betty "Tiny" Norton
Philo McCullough 	... 	Sheriff Tom Collier 
Victor Potel 	... 	Dick 
Ben Corbett 	... 	Tom 
Tiny Skelton	... 	Harry
Claude Payton 	... Bruce Laird
Robert McKenzie ... Judge Blake 
Dick Botiller 	... 	Gonzalez

Quotes
"I'll get you for this!" - Sheriff Collier
"Don't let anything stop you but fear" - Ted Wright

Notes

External links 

1934 films
American black-and-white films
Films based on American novels
1934 Western (genre) films
American Western (genre) films
Films directed by Edgar G. Ulmer
1930s English-language films
1930s American films